Dušan Tuma (born October 30, 1943 in Ljubljana) is a Yugoslav retired slalom canoeist who competed from the late 1960s to the mid-1970s. He finished 19th in the C-2 event at the 1972 Summer Olympics in Munich.

References
 Sports-reference.com profile

1943 births
Canoeists at the 1972 Summer Olympics
Living people
Olympic canoeists of Yugoslavia
Yugoslav male canoeists
Slovenian male canoeists
Sportspeople from Ljubljana